Lord Henry Cavendish-Bentinck (28 May 1863 – 6 October 1931), known as Henry Cavendish-Bentinck until 1880, was a British Conservative politician.

Biography
Cavendish-Bentinck was the eldest son of Lieutenant-General Arthur Cavendish-Bentinck from his second marriage to Augusta Mary Elizabeth, 1st Baroness Bolsover. His paternal grandfather Lord William Charles Augustus Cavendish-Bentinck was the third son of William Cavendish-Bentinck, 3rd Duke of Portland, while William Cavendish-Bentinck, 6th Duke of Portland, was his elder half-brother. In 1880 he was granted the rank of a younger son of a duke on his half-brother's succession to the dukedom.

He entered Parliament for Norfolk North-West in 1886, defeating Joseph Arch, a seat he lost in 1892, when Arch reclaimed the seat. He returned to the House of Commons in 1895 when he was elected for Nottingham South, a seat he held until 1906 and again from 1910 to 1929.

Cavendish-Bentinck held a commission in the Derbyshire Imperial Yeomanry, where he gained the rank of lieutenant-colonel. He served in the Second Boer War in South Africa 1899–1900, where he was appointed to the Staff on 20 February 1900.

Family
Cavendish-Bentinck married, in 1882, Lady Olivia Caroline Amelia, daughter of Thomas Taylour, Earl of Bective, and granddaughter of the 3rd Marquess of Headfort. She was known as Lady Henry Bentick, and was mentioned in despatches (29 November 1900) by Lord Roberts, Commander-in-Chief, for civilian services during the Second Boer War.

Lord Henry died in October 1931, aged 68. Lady Henry died in November 1939, aged 70.

Notes

References
Kidd, Charles, Williamson, David (editors). Debrett's Peerage and Baronetage (1990 edition). New York: St Martin's Press, 1990,

External links 

1863 births
1931 deaths
Lord-Lieutenants of Westmorland
Members of the Parliament of the United Kingdom for English constituencies
UK MPs 1886–1892
UK MPs 1895–1900
UK MPs 1900–1906
UK MPs 1910
UK MPs 1910–1918
UK MPs 1918–1922
UK MPs 1922–1923
UK MPs 1923–1924
UK MPs 1924–1929
Members of London County Council
Derbyshire Yeomanry officers
Conservative Party (UK) MPs for English constituencies